Aizawl Theological College is an ecumenical seminary of the Presbyterian Church in Aizawl, Mizoram, India.  It is affiliated to the Senate of Serampore College (University). The college is owned by the Mizoram Presbyterian Church and administered by the Mizoram Synod through its Theological Education Board. Hundreds of pastors and church leaders have received their academic training and ministerial formation under the standards laid down by the Senate of Serampore College since its inception in 1907.

Location
The College is located at the top of a mountain, north of Aizawl, at Durtlang.

History
Aizawl Theological College was started by Rev. D.E. Jones, popularly known as Pu Zosaphluia among the Mizos, in 1907 as a humble theological school to train native Christians for various ministries of the church. It was originally named "Aijal Theological School". In 1924, the theological school was shifted from Aizawl to Durtlang at the present site of the Presbyterian Hospital. Rev. F.J. Sandy managed the administration. But Sandy unexpectedly died and the school was moved back to Aizawl proper and headed by Rev. E.L. Mendus. The school was closed in 1937 affected by circumstances of the Second World War. It was revived in 1964 to become a proper theological college. Rev. J.M. Lloyd became the first designated Principal and the college was located at Mission Vengthlang, Aizawl. The Senate of Serampore College granted affiliation to the college at the level of Licentiate in Theology (L.Th.) in 1965. The college was then officially named "Aizawl Theological College." When Rev. J.M. Lloyd returned to Wales he was succeeded by Rev. C. Pazawna who became the first Mizo Principal of the College. He remained in office for seventeen years. In 1971, the College was upgraded to the B. Th. level by the Senate of Serampore College, replacing the L. Th. diploma course programme. In 1994 that the Senate of Serampore College allowed Aizawl Theological College to start the B.D. programme. In June 1998 the Council for Academic Affairs of the Senate of Serampore College granted Aizawl Theological College the status of a full-fledged B.D. College. The Master of Theology (M.Th) programme in Christian Theology had been introduced since 2002 and M.Th. (New Testament and Missiology) and Doctor of Ministry (D.Min) respectively are also being introduced from 2007 academic session.

Courses offered 
 Certificate Course in Christian Studies
 Bachelor of Christian Studies (BCS)
 Master of Christian Studies (MCS)
 Diploma in Clinical Pastoral Counselling (DCPC) 
 Bachelor of Divinity (B.D)
 Master of Theology (M.Th)
 Doctor of Theology (D.Th)

Publications 
 The Mizoram Journal of Theology, an academic journal is also published bi-annually since 1999.
 Didakhe, a bimonthly theological journal has been published since 1972, with a circulation of 4,700 copies. This is an important medium by which theological discussions on relevant issues are kept alive.

References

External links 

Official site of Aizawl Theological College

Seminaries and theological colleges in India
Universities and colleges in Mizoram
Presbyterian universities and colleges
Christian seminaries and theological colleges in India
Education in Aizawl
Seminaries and theological colleges affiliated to the Senate of Serampore College (University)
1907 establishments in India
Educational institutions established in 1907